Mesosa sophiae is an extinct species of beetle in the family Cerambycidae, that existed during the Upper Oligocene. It was described by Statz in 1938, originally under the genus Haplocnemia. It is known from Germany.

References

sophiae
Beetles described in 1938